Pyramid Gang Records (originally Pyramid Gang Entertainment) is an American record label, distribution, and management company based in Alabama and Atlanta, Georgia. The company was founded in 2011 and established in 2014 by music executive Jahmirris "Jay" Smith. Today, It operates in Atlanta, Georgia with affiliations with other prominent independent record labels and home to R&B artist King Montiez.

See also 
 List of record labels

References

External links
Pyramid Gang Entertainment home page

American record labels
2014 establishments in Georgia (U.S. state)
American companies established in 2014